Eupithecia canonica is a moth in the  family Geometridae. It is found in Peru.

The wingspan is about 26 mm for males. The forewings are violet grey, with dark fuscous irroration. The hindwings are dirty whitish, becoming greyer at the distal margin.

References

Moths described in 1916
canonica
Moths of South America